Mark Peter Arie (March 27, 1882 – November 19, 1958) was an American sport shooter who competed in the 1920 Summer Olympics in Antwerp, Belgium. He won a gold medal in the trap shooting and also in the team clay pigeons.

References

External links

1882 births
1958 deaths
People from Champaign County, Illinois
American male sport shooters
Trap and double trap shooters
Shooters at the 1920 Summer Olympics
Olympic gold medalists for the United States in shooting
Olympic medalists in shooting
Medalists at the 1920 Summer Olympics
20th-century American people